The St. Francois Mountains in southeast Missouri are a mountain range of Precambrian igneous mountains rising over the Ozark Plateau. This range is one of the oldest exposures of igneous rock in North America.
The name of the range is spelled out as Saint Francois Mountains in official GNIS sources, but it is sometimes misspelled in use as St. Francis Mountains to match the anglicized pronunciation of both the range and St. Francois County.

Name

The name of the range derives from the St. Francis River, which originates in the St. Francois Mountains. The origin of the river's name, which also was originally spelled "François" in the French manner, is unclear. The area, as part of the Louisiana district of New France, is near some of the earliest French settlements in Missouri, where many French place names survive. Some sources conjecture that the name honors St. Francis of Assisi (1181/1182–1226), the patron saint of the Franciscan order, but none of the region's early explorers were Franciscans.  Others propose that Jacques Marquette, a French Jesuit, named the river when he explored its mouth in present-day Arkansas in 1673. Before his voyage down the Mississippi River, Marquette had spent some time at the mission of St. François Xavier, named for the Jesuit missionary Francis Xavier (1506–1552).  The spelling of the river's name shifted from "Francois" to "Francis" in the early 20th century.

Geology

The St. Francois Mountains were formed by volcanic and intrusive activity 1.485 billion (1.485 x 109) years ago.  By comparison, the Appalachians started forming about 460 million years ago, and the Rockies a mere 140 million years ago. When the Appalachians started forming, the St. Francois range was already twice as old as the Appalachians are today.

The intrusive rocks of the area are composed of three types: subvolcanic massifs, ring intrusions and central plutons.

The subvolcanic intrusives are similar in geochemistry to the associated rhyolite volcanics, which they intrude into. They are granite with granophyric quartz, perthitic potassium feldspar, biotite and magnetite. They are intrusive into the rhyolites with development of fine grained granophyre at the contact. At depth they exhibit a coarse-grained rapakivi texture. 
The subvolcanic granites are the most widespread igneous rocks and were thought to have been covered with extensive volcanics that have been removed by erosion.

The ring intrusives are high silica bodies which were intruded along ring faults associated with caldera collapse. Rock types include trachyandesite, trachyte, syenite and amphibole - biotite granite. They are commonly porphyritic.

The central plutons are highly evolved two mica (contain both biotite and muscovite) granites. Distinctive accessory minerals include: fluorite, topaz, apatite, spinel, allanite, sphene and cassiterite. They are enriched in tin, lithium, beryllium, rubidium, barium, yttrium, niobium, uranium, thorium and fluorine and are referred to as "tin granites'. Their circular to oval shape in plan view is consistent with emplacement within resurgent calderas.

The exposed igneous rocks of the St. Francois are surrounded at depth by the slightly younger (~100 my) widely distributed igneous Spavinaw terrane. The Spavinaw rocks are intersected in drill core across southern Missouri, southern Illinois, northern Arkansas, southern Kansas and northeastern Oklahoma. The Spavinaw rocks occur in outcrop only near Spavinaw, Oklahoma. The rhyolites and ash flow tuffs of the Spavinaw are essentially identical to the volcanics of the St. Francois mountains (the Washington County volcanics).

The Saint Francois Mountains were formed by igneous activity, whereas most of the surrounding Ozarks are developed on Paleozoic sedimentary rocks as a dissected plateau. The localized vertical relief was caused by erosion following uplift during the Pennsylvanian and Permian periods produced by the Ouachita orogeny to the south. Elevations and strata dips in the Ozark structural dome generally radiate downward and outward away from the Saint Francois mountains.

These ancient mountains may be the only area in the Midwestern United States never to have been submerged, (as evidenced by the lack of marine fossils) existing as an island archipelago in the Paleozoic seas.  Fossilized coral, the remains of ancient reefs, can be found among the rocks around the flanks of the mountains. These ancient reef complexes formed the localizing structures for the mineralizing fluids that resulted in the rich ore deposits of the area.

The igneous rocks of the Saint Francois Mts. are interpreted to be a series of caldera complexes, similar in scale to the Yellowstone Caldera complex. However, it is debated whether the igneous activity was related to a hotspot, like Yellowstone, or whether it was related to an ancient subduction zone.

Mineral resources 

The St. Francois Mountains are the center of the Lead Belt, a mining region yielding lead, iron, baryte, zinc, silver, manganese, cobalt, and nickel ores. Historic Mine La Motte near Fredericktown was the site of lead mining activity by the French as early as 1720. The area today accounts for over 90% of primary lead production in the United States.

Granite has been commercially quarried since 1869 in the vicinity of Elephant Rocks State Park, a tor with huge weathered granite boulders. The red architectural granite quarried in the area has been used in buildings in St. Louis and other areas in the country. It is currently marketed as Missouri Red monument stone.

Structural features
Hughes Mountain contains a good example of columnar jointing in igneous rhyolite, the same process that formed Devils Tower in Wyoming and the Giant's Causeway in Ireland. The columnar jointing in this area is called the 
Devil's Honeycomb.

Peaks

Mountains in this range include; Taum Sauk Mountain, Bell Mountain, Buford Mountain, Proffit Mountain, Pilot Knob, Hughes Mountain, Goggin Mountain and Lead Hill Mountain. Black Mountain, in Madison County, has the highest rise in elevation from its base, along the St. Francis River (540 feet above sea level) to its summit (1,502 feet above sea level), a rise of just under 1,000 feet in elevation.

Recreation 

Five Missouri state parks – Johnson's Shut-Ins, Taum Sauk Mountain, St. Joe, Sam A. Baker and Elephant Rocks – are located in this region.  Public lands held by the Missouri Department of Conservation provide access for hiking, backpacking, hunting, fishing, canoeing, and boating. The Mark Twain National Forest contains additional public lands, including the Bell Mountain Wilderness. A section of the Ozark Trail winds through parts of the St. Francois Mountains, including a popular segment that crosses Taum Sauk and Proffit mountains.

The St. Francis River in this area is a whitewater stream in the spring when water levels are up, and it has hosted the Missouri Whitewater Championships annually since 1968.

See also
 Geography of Missouri
 Missouri National and State Parks
 Taum Sauk pumped storage plant

References

 Unklesbay, A.G; & Vineyard, Jerry D. (1992). Missouri Geology — Three Billion Years of Volcanoes, Seas, Sediments, and Erosion. University of Missouri Press. .

 
Mountain ranges of Missouri
Regions of Missouri
Volcanism of Missouri
Proterozoic volcanism
Landforms of Iron County, Missouri
Landforms of Reynolds County, Missouri
Landforms of Washington County, Missouri
Landforms of Wayne County, Missouri
Landforms of Madison County, Missouri
Landforms of St. Francois County, Missouri
Landforms of Jefferson County, Missouri
Landforms of Bollinger County, Missouri
Landforms of Ste. Genevieve County, Missouri
Landforms of the Ozarks